Dionysis Chiotis (born 4 June 1977) is a Greek former professional footballer who played as a goalkeeper. Currently, he serves as a goalkeeping coach for AEK Athens Academy.

Club career

AEK Athens
Chiotis took his first football steps in the team of Daphni Daphniou Chaidari. There, he was spotted by people of AEK and brought him to the club's academies. After 2.5 years, Dušan Bajević promoted him to the men's team. In January 1999, he went on loan to Ethnikos Piraeus and in July of the same year he went on loan to Proodeftiki for 1 year where he performed very well. He returned to AEK in 2000, he stayed on the bench as a back-up of Ilias Atmatsidis for another season and then, he managed to establish himself as a starter for a long period since 2001. On 20 April 2002 at one of the worst moments of his career, in the crucial away match against Olympiacos, that decided the champion, his miscommunication with the defender Ferrugem in the 58th minute, gave their opponents the opportunity to score their third goal, which judged to a large extent the negative course of the match, where AEK eventually lost 4–3 along with the title. Ηowever, a week later, in the cup final at the same stadium and against the same opponent, AEK got their revenge by winning 2–1 and with Chiotis was named mvp of the match. The following season, Chiotis had his best year at AEK, with an amazing performance both in the league and in the big matches for the UEFA Champions League. In 2005, the arrival of Stefano Sorrentino, combined with an injury suffered by Chiotis, left him out of the team again and since then he has not been a regular. In the summer of 2007, with Lorenzo Serra Ferrer at the bench, Chiotis left AEK after 13 years. With AEK he won 3 cups and 1 Super Cup.

Kerkyra
On 22 May 2007, Chiotis was released by AEK to join Kerkyra, where he signed a one-year contract which was terminated on 6 May 2008.

APOEL
In June 2008, he joined APOEL and with his high-level appearances, he contributed to the winning of the Cyprus Championship 2008–09 and the qualification for the first time of the club at the group stage of the 2009–10 UEFA Champions League. In that season, his club had the lowest number of goals conceded. He was also voted as the MVP of the club for that season and became one of the favorite players of APOEL fans.

In the 2009–10 Champions League group stage he helped APOEL to take a point against Atletico Madrid in Spain by holding Atletico to zero. At the same week he was voted as the best goalkeeper of the week in the Champions League. He appeared in all six official 2009–10 UEFA Champions League group stage matches with APOEL and he had great performances.

The next season, he helped APOEL to win the 2010–11 Cypriot First Division, adding the second championship title to his honours list.

The following season, he appeared in six 2011–12 UEFA Champions League matches for APOEL, in the club's surprising run to the quarter-finals of the competition. On 7 March 2012, Chiotis helped APOEL to reach the UEFA Champions League quarter-finals by saving two penalties in the penalty shoot-out of the last 16 return match against Olympique Lyonnais.

At the end of the 2012–13 season, he became a champion for the third time in his career after winning the 2012–13 Cypriot First Division with APOEL.

During the 2013–14 season, he appeared in one 2013–14 UEFA Europa League group stage match for APOEL and managed to win all the titles in Cyprus, the Cypriot League, the Cypriot Cup and the Cypriot Super Cup.

On 25 May 2015, one day after winning the 2014–15 season double with APOEL, the team announced that Chiotis was leaving after 7 years in the club, as his contract would not be renewed. Eventually he had 121 appearances with the club in all competitions.

Trikala
On 24 June 2015, aged 38, Chiotis signed a contract with Panelefsiniakos, but he left the team two months later due to important changes to the club's board of directors. A few days later, on 26 August 2015, he signed a contract with the Greek Football League side Trikala.

Apollon Smyrnis
On 29 June 2016, aged 39, Chiotis signed a contract with Apollon Smyrnis, in his club's effort to be promoted to Super League.

International career
Chiotis competed with Greece once in 20 November 2002, in a friendly match against Finland for 45 minutes replacing Antonis Nikopolidis.

Honours

AEK Athens
Greek Cup: 1995–96, 1996–97, 2001–02
Greek Super Cup: 1996

APOEL
Cypriot First Division: 2008–09, 2010–11, 2012–13, 2013–14, 2014–15
Cypriot Cup: 2013–14, 2014–15
Cypriot Super Cup: 2008, 2009, 2011, 2013

References

External links
APOEL official profile

1977 births
Living people
Greece international footballers
Greek expatriate footballers
Association football goalkeepers
AEK Athens F.C. players
Ethnikos Piraeus F.C. players
Proodeftiki F.C. players
A.O. Kerkyra players
APOEL FC players
Trikala F.C. players
Apollon Smyrnis F.C. players
Super League Greece players
Cypriot First Division players
Expatriate footballers in Cyprus
Greek expatriate sportspeople in Cyprus
Greek expatriate sportspeople in the United Arab Emirates
Footballers from Athens
Greek footballers